Gary Steffes (born May 20, 1987) is an American former professional ice hockey player. He primarily played in the American Hockey League (AHL) and ECHL.

Playing career
Steffes played for Team USA at the 2005 IIHF World U18 Championships held in the Czech Republic.
Following four years of NCAA college hockey play with the Miami RedHawks men's ice hockey team, Steffes turned professional with the Tulsa Oilers of the Central Hockey League. He was rewarded for his outstanding play during his rookie season when he was named to the 2010–11 CHL All-Rookie Team.

Steffes was invited to the Oklahoma City Barons of the American Hockey League training camp prior to 2012–13. Without a contract offer from the Barons and during his third season with the Oilers, Steffes was loaned to the Lake Erie Monsters of the AHL on a professional try-out contract on January 8, 2013. In 16 games with the Monsters, Steffes recorded 1 goal and 2 points before he was returned to Tulsa for the remainder of the year.

On July 24, 2013, Steffes signed a one-year contract as a free agent to play in the ECHL with the Bakersfield Condors. In the 2013–14 season, Steffes spent the full season with the Condors, posting 18 goals and 35 points in 60 games.

In the off-season, Steffes opted to return to the CHL, in signing a one-year contract with the Allen Americans on August 15, 2014. Before the commencement of the season, the Americans joined the ECHL. He finished out his career with the Americans in 2020.

Career statistics

Awards and honors

References

External links

1987 births
Living people
Allen Americans players
Bakersfield Condors (1998–2015) players
Cedar Rapids RoughRiders players
Lake Erie Monsters players
Miami RedHawks men's ice hockey players
Milwaukee Admirals players
San Jose Barracuda players
Tulsa Oilers (1992–present) players
People from Grand Blanc, Michigan
American men's ice hockey centers